Thomas Curley may refer to:

Thomas Curley (Wisconsin general) (1825–1904), American Civil War general and politician
Thomas Curley (sound engineer) (born 1976), American production sound mixer
Tom Curley (born 1948), American journalist
Tom Curley (footballer), (born 1945), Scottish footballer